Protrinemura is a genus of silverfishes in the family Protrinemuridae. Three species are currently known:
Protinemura orientalis Silvestri, 1942 – China: Fujian province
Protinemura mediterranea Mendes, 1988 – Greece: Cyclades archipelago
Protinemura leclerci Mendes, 2002 – Thailand: Chiang Rai province

References

Further reading

 
 

Insect genera
Articles created by Qbugbot